The Swellers were an American punk band from Flint, Michigan. Their music is influenced by melodic punk rock, as well as alternative and indie rock bands, from the 1990s.  They disbanded in 2015.

Band history
On June 24, 2002, brothers Nick and Jonathan Diener brought their friend Nate Lamberts from Grand Rapids, MI to Fenton, MI to jam. In the following days, The Swellers was formed and recorded a 3-song demo.

After a week, the band booked its first show at the Flint Local 432 in Flint, Michigan opening for the band Divit.

After a few years of playing shows all over Michigan and eventually the Midwest, The Swellers recruited Nick Ondovcsik on 2nd guitar. After a short lived stint with the band, Ondovcsik left in order to pursue other musical interests, eventually forming the death metal band Ares Letum. In early 2005, Lamberts followed, leaving to pursue a college education. Close friends and fellow members of the Flint music scene at the time, Garrett Burgett and Lance Nelson, joined soon after on bass and guitar.

The band recorded Beginning Of The End Again in the spring of 2005 at Sentient Studios in Flint, MI. That summer the band signed to Search and Rescue Records and played a Midwestern/Canadian leg of the Vans Warped Tour.

In June and July 2006, the band embarked on a tour of the US. Since the summer of 2006, The Swellers has been constantly touring the U.S. That same year, they signed to Japanese Label Radtone Music, and flew out to do a week of shows.

In November and December 2006, The Swellers went to the newly moved Sentient Studio in Chicago, Illinois to record their full-length album, My Everest. The album was released on June 5, 2007 through Search and Rescue Records.

From the months of March 2008 to May, Lance and Garrett left the group before several large tours.
The Swellers enlisted Ryan Collins, the guitarist of the fellow labelmates and now defunct act, Alucard (whose other guitarist, Mike Supina, recently joined A Wilhelm Scream), and close friend Brad Linden to fulfill the bass duties for several months.

On August 25, 2008, the band released a 15-track album of "personalized" songs via PureVolume.

Second guitar player Ryan Collins joined the band prior to the recording of Ups and Downsizing, and soon after, bassist Anto Boros, previously of the Canadian band, Sydney, joined The Swellers to round out the new lineup.

Their Fueled By Ramen debut, titled Ups and Downsizing, was recorded at Drasik Studios in Chicago, IL by Mark Michalik and was released on September 29, 2009. In support of the album, The Swellers toured as an opening act for Paramore's 'Brand New Eyes' tour, which began on September 29, 2009.

The Swellers was an opening act for Less Than Jake on their Winter United States tour, along with the street punk band, The Casualties. Throughout early 2010, The Swellers went on tour with Motion City Soundtrack for their My Dinosaur Life Tour.

The Swellers journeyed to Europe for the first time in 2010 and played the Give It A Name Festival in several countries, Groezrock in Belgium, then headlined the Give It A Name Introduces Tour in the UK with Anarbor and The Dangerous Summer.

From June 25 to July 17, 2010, The Swellers played Vans Warped Tour for the second time on the Ernie Ball Stage.

In March the band was named one of Shred News's 'Artists to watch in 2010'

The band supported Anti-Flag in October on the Vans Off The Wall Tour in Europe, flew home to play The Fest 9 in Gainesville, FL with The Suicide Machines, Strike Anywhere and A Wilhelm Scream. One month later the band went back overseas to support Young Guns.

In April 2011 The Swellers supported The Blackout on their UK & Ireland tour for their 3rd studio album Hope

In 2011, The Swellers joined Bayside, Silverstein, Polar Bear Club and Texas in July on the Take Action Tour.

It was announced April 22, 2011, through Alternative Press that the new album titled Good For Me would be released on June 14, where one of the new tracks called "Best I Ever Had" could be streamed.

In April 2012 they announced their departure from the Fueled by Ramen label. They would release a 7" (Vehicle City Blues) on Side One Dummy Records.

On October 16, The Swellers self-released an EP entitled Running Out Of Places To Go.  It is composed of five songs that the band recorded and produced independently.

The Swellers signed to No Sleep Records in May 2013 and announced in August 2013 that they would be releasing their 4th full length, The Light Under Closed Doors, on October 29.

On April 15, 2014, The Swellers announced via Facebook their release of "B-sides and Rarities."

On June 24, 2014 they announced via Facebook and Twitter that they would be breaking up and booking farewell shows.

In February and March 2015, the band performed at Soundwave (Australian music festival). On May 1, 2015, they played their last show at Groezrock.

Band members
Final line-up
Nick Diener — guitar and lead vocals (2002–2015)
Jonathan Diener — drums and backing vocals (2002–2015)
Ryan Collins — guitar (2008–2015)
Anto Boros — bass and backing vocals (2009–2015)

Former members
Nick Ondovcsik — guitar (2004)
Garrett Burgett — guitar (2004–2008)
Nate Lamberts — bass (2002–2005)
Lance Nelson — bass (2005–2008)
Brad Linden — bass (2008–2009)

Timeline

Discography

Albums
End of Discussion — Self-Released: December 3, 2003
My Everest — Released: March 19, 2007  on Search and Rescue Records and Radtone Music in Japan
Ups and Downsizing — Released: September 29, 2009 on Fueled By Ramen
Good for Me — Released: June 14, 2011 on Fueled By Ramen
The Light Under Closed Doors — Released: October 29, 2013 on No Sleep Records

7"
 Welcome Back Riders — 7" Vinyl Released July 28, 2009 on Fueled By Ramen and Paper + Plastick
 Vehicle City Blues — 7" Vinyl Released May 29, 2012 on Side One Dummy

EPs
Beginning of the End Again — Released: August 11, 2005 on Search and Rescue Records
Running Out Of Places To Go — Self-Released: October 16, 2012

Demos
 Long and Hard  Self-Released (2002)

Compilations
 First Taste Of The Morning (2005) TDR
 Pop Punk Loves You 3 (2007) Wynonna Records
 Everyone Living Under A Gun (2008) The Political Party Records
 Rock Against Malaria (2009) Eunuch Records
 Take Action! Vol 9. (2010) Sub City Records
 No Sleep 'Till Christmas 3 (2010) No Sleep Records
 Warped Tour 2010 Tour Compilation (2010) SideOneDummy Records
 Take Action! Vol 10. (2011) Sub City Records
 B-sides and Rarities (2014)
 Not Safe To Drink: Music For Flint Water Crisis Relief (2016)

Music Videos
 "Tunnel Vision" (2006)
 "Bottles" (2007)
 "Fire Away" (2009)
 "Sleeper" (2010)
 "The Best I Ever Had" (2011)
 "Inside My Head" (2012)
 "Hands" (2012)
 "Running Out of Places to Go" (2013)
 "Should" (2013)
 "High/Low" (2013)
 "Got Social" (2013)

References

External links

Official website
Myspace page of The Swellers
PureVolume | The Swellers
Interview with The Swellers on SGM Music Webzine 2010

Punk rock groups from Michigan
Musical groups from Flint, Michigan
Musical groups established in 2002
Musical groups disestablished in 2014
Fueled by Ramen artists
No Sleep Records artists